Ernest William "Ernie" DuBester (born September 4, 1950) is an American lawyer, academic, and government official who has served as a member of the Federal Labor Relations Authority since 2009. He began his career at the National Labor Relations Board as counsel to former chairman and member John H. Fanning. DuBester was also a union attorney with the firm of Highsaw & Mahoney, and legislative counsel to the AFL–CIO. From 1993 to 2001, he was chairman and member at the National Mediation Board. From 2001 to 2005, DuBester was the professor and director of the Dispute Resolution Program at the Antonin Scalia Law School.

He has been serving as Acting Chair of the Federal Labor Relations Authority since January 21, 2021, and is the current nominee to permanently chair the Authority.

References

External links
 Biography at U.S. Federal Labor Relations Authority

1950 births
Living people
Boston College alumni
Columbus School of Law alumni
Georgetown University Law Center alumni
20th-century American lawyers
21st-century American lawyers
Clinton administration personnel
Obama administration personnel
Trump administration personnel